Narendra Pradhan is an Indian politician. He was a Member of Parliament, representing Odisha in the Rajya Sabha, the upper house of India's Parliament, as a member of the Janata Dal.

References

Rajya Sabha members from Odisha
Janata Dal politicians
1947 births
Living people